Lippo Group is an Indonesian multinational conglomerate company. The company operates internationally providing property development and management services. It was founded by Mochtar Riady. Lippo has a collective presence across Asia and North America. Lippo Group is one of the largest real estate developers in Indonesia, and is known for various large-scale projects such as Lippo Village.

Lippo Group's members Lippo Limited, Lippo Karawaci are listed companies.

Company history

The Lippo Group began with Lippo Bank, later using this as a platform for regional property development projects.  In 2001, the Lippo Group delved into the education market with the newly minted Putian University (in Putian, Fujian Province, China) by providing international training (using English) for specially-selected accounting and computer science students.

Lippo Group controls in excess of $15 billion in assets with significant investments in retail, media, real estate, banking, natural resources, hospitality, and healthcare industries.  The group's flagship operating platforms include OUE Singapore, Lippo Karawaci Indonesia, Hypermart, Matahari, Siloam Hospitals Indonesia, First REIT, LMIR REIT, Auric Pacific, and Lippo Incheon Development.

Company group 
 Multipolar
 Matahari Department Store
 Matahari Putra Prima
 Hypermart
 Foodmart
 SmartClub Metropolis
 Foodmart Primo
 Boston Health and Beauty
 Timezone
 Superoti
 Multipolar Technology
 Books & Beyond
 Visionet
 Multifiling Mitra Indonesia
 GTN
 Tecnoves International
 Sharestar Indonesia
 Lippo Karawaci
 Lippo Cikarang
 Lippo Village
 Lippo Land Club
 Lippo Malls
 Benton Junction
 Bellanova Country Mall
 Cibubur Junction
 Depok Town Square
 Lippo Plaza Bogor
 Gajahmada Plaza
 Grand Mall Bekasi
 Lippo Plaza Kramat Jati
 Lippo Mall Kemang
 Lippo Mall Puri
 Mal Lippo Cikarang
 Metropolis Town Square
 Plaza Semanggi
 Pejaten Village
 Pluit Village
 PX Pavilion @ St. Moritz
 Tamini Square
 WTC Matahari
 Bandung Indah Plaza
 Istana Plaza
 City of Tomorrow
 Lippo Plaza Sidoarjo
 Lippo Plaza Kendari
 Malang Town Square
 Lippo Plaza Batu
 GTC Makassar
 Lippo Plaza Manado
 Plaza Medan Fair
 Grand Palladium
 Binjai Supermall
 Sun Plaza
 Palembang Square
 Palembang Square Extension
 Lippo Plaza Jakabaring
 Lippo Mall Yogya
 Lippo Plaza Jember
 Meikarta
 Lippo Homes
 Benton Junction
 Country Club
 Permata Sport Club
 Maxx Coffee
 San Diego Hills Memorial Park
 Menara Matahari
 Atisa Dipamkara School
 Aryaduta Hotels
 Siloam Hospitals
 Commodity Square
 Nobu Bank
 Lippo General Insurance
 Lippo Life
 Maxx Coffee
 Maxx Kitchen
 Venturra Capital
 Pelita Harapan Education Foundation
 Pelita Harapan University
 Pelita Harapan School
 Dian Harapan School
 Lentera Harapan School

Former holdings 
 Axis Telecom (formerly known as Lippo Telecom; sold to Maxis Communications and Saudi Telecom Company; currently owned by XL Axiata)
 Lippo Bank (merged into Bank CIMB Niaga)
 Cinépolis Indonesia (formerly known as Cinemaxx; now owned by Cinépolis)
 OVO (sold to Grab)
 First Media (sold to XL Axiata)
 LinkNet (sold to XL Axiata)
 B Universe (spin-off)

See also
 Lippo Limited, a Hong Kong listed company also owned by Riady
 Hongkong Chinese Limited, a Hong Kong listed company
 Hongkong Chinese Bank, a Hong Kong bank that was sold by Hongkong Chinese Limited in 2002 and became defunct in the same year due to merger
 Lippo China Resources

References

Conglomerate companies of Indonesia
Companies based in Jakarta
Conglomerate companies established in 1950
Real estate companies established in 1950
Indonesian companies established in 1950